Michael Fitzmaurice (born 18 September 1969) is an Irish Independent politician who has been a Teachta Dála (TD) for the Roscommon–Galway constituency since the 2016 general election, and previously from 2014 to 2016 for the Roscommon–South Leitrim constituency.

Before becoming a politician, Fitzmaurice used to run an agricultural and turf contracting business. He is the chair of the Turf Cutters and Contractors Association.

Political career
He was elected to Galway County Council for the Tuam local electoral area following the local elections held in May 2014. He entered national politics in a by-election caused by the election of Luke 'Ming' Flanagan to the European Parliament. He was endorsed by Flanagan.

He was a founding member of the Independent Alliance, which was formed in 2015. On 18 May 2016, Fitzmaurice, was the only Independent Alliance TD to vote against Enda Kenny as Taoiseach. He later announced that day he was leaving the group and would not join the government.

Policies
Fitzmaurice is in favour of cutting "turf" (peat). Turbary rights have been affected by the Habitats Directive, which has resulted in the protection of some raised bogs in Ireland since the 1990s. As at the end of 2018 protection of some bogs as Special Areas of Conservation remains in force, but Fitzmaurice and other politicians have succeeded in removing protection from some bogs designated as Natural Heritage Areas under the Wildlife (Amendment) Act 2000.

He supports water meters, although he thinks some usage should be free to consumers.

Fitzmaurice is a critic of environmental vegetarianism. Defending Irish livestock farmers, he criticised the former President Mary Robinson for advocating reduced meat and dairy consumption so that people have a lower carbon footprint. Along with several other TDs, he later criticised Taoiseach Leo Varadkar for comments about trying to reduce his consumption of meat.

References

1969 births
Living people
Local councillors in County Galway
Independent TDs
Members of the 31st Dáil
Members of the 32nd Dáil
Members of the 33rd Dáil